Coleen Perez, (born Coleen Nicole Perez Borgonia on January 26, 1995 in Gapan, Nueva Ecija, Philippines), is a Filipina commercial model and actress, known for her roles such as Molly Rivera in GMA Network's More Than Words.

Filmography

Television

References

External links
Coleen Perez at GMANetwork.com

1995 births
Living people
Filipino television actresses
People from Nueva Ecija
Actresses from Nueva Ecija
GMA Network personalities